Plenasium is a genus of ferns in the family Osmundaceae. It is recognized in the Pteridophyte Phylogeny Group classification of 2016 (PPG I), but kept within a more broadly circumscribed genus Osmunda by other sources. The genus is known from Early Cretaceous to present.

Taxonomy
, the Checklist of Ferns and Lycophytes of the World accepted the following four species:

Phylogeny of Plenasium

The following fossil species are also accepted.

 †P. arnoldii (C.N.Mill. 1967) Bomfleur, Grimm & McLoughlin 2017
 †P. bransonii (Tidwell & Medlyn, 1991) Bomfleur, Grimm & McLoughlin 2017 (?Eocene: New Mexico, USA).
 †P. burgii (Tidwell & J.E.Skog, 2002) Bomfleur, Grimm & McLoughlin 2017 (Early Cretaceous: Nebraska, USA).
 †P. chandleri (Arnold 1952) Bomfleur, Grimm & McLoughlin 
 †P. crossii (Tidwell & L.R.Parker, 1987) Bomfleur, Grimm & McLoughlin 2017 (Paleocene: Wyoming, USA).
 †P. dakotense (Tidwell & J.E.Skog, 2002) Bomfleur, Grimm & McLoughlin 2017 (Early Cretaceous: South Dakota, USA).
 †P. dowkeri (Carruthers 1870) Bomfleur, Grimm & McLoughlin 2017 
 †P. moorei (Tidwell & Medlyn, 1991) Bomfleur, Grimm & McLoughlin 2017 (?Eocene: New Mexico, USA).
 †P. nebraskense (Tidwell & J.E.Skog, 2002) Bomfleur, Grimm & McLoughlin 2017 (Early Cretaceous: Nebraska, USA).
†P. (Aurealcaulis) elegans Hiller et al. 2019 (Eocene, Vietnam)
†P. (Plenasium) xiei Cheng et al. 2019 (Late Cretaceous, Northeastern China)

References

Osmundales
Fern genera